Invisible Nature is a live album by English saxophonist John Surman and American drummer Jack DeJohnette recorded in Tampere and Berlin in 1999 and released on the ECM label.

Reception 
The Allmusic review by Scott Yanow awarded the album 4 stars, stating, "The performances are atmospheric, with both players utilizing electronics in spots while retaining their own musical personalities. Surman has long been a very flexible and mostly laid-back player, while DeJohnette also has the ability to fit in almost anywhere. Rather than individual melodies or solos, this CD is most notable for its overall feel and the blend between these two unique musicians".

Track listing
All compositions by John Surman and Jack DeJohnette.
 "Mysterium" – 15:57   
 "Rising Tide" – 9:32   
 "Outback Spirits" – 12:30   
 "Underground Movement" – 9:45   
 "Ganges Groove" – 6:36   
 "Fair Trade" – 11:21   
 "Song for World Forgiveness" – 9:29

Personnel 
 John Surman – soprano saxophone, baritone saxophone, bass clarinet, synthesizer
 Jack DeJohnette – drums, electronic percussion, piano

References 

ECM Records albums
John Surman albums
2002 albums
Albums produced by Manfred Eicher